The Jodel D18 is a French ultralight aircraft, designed and produced by Jodel.

Design and development
The original amateur-built category D18 was adapted to comply with the Fédération Aéronautique Internationale microlight rules with the addition of larger flaps and renamed the D185. Both the D18 and D185 feature a cantilever low wing, two seats in a side-by-side enclosed cockpit configuration, fixed conventional landing gear and a single engine in tractor configuration.

A tricycle landing gear-equipped version is designated D19 for the amateur-built category and D195 for the microlight category.

All the aircraft in the series are all made with a wooden structure, covered in doped aircraft fabric. The  span wing employs polyhedral configuration with the outer wing panels exhibiting much greater dihedral. Engines used include the  Jabiru 2200 four-stroke powerplant as well as Rotax, Limbach Flugmotoren and  Volkswagen 1600 automotive engines.

Variants

D18
Original design for the amateur-built category.
D185
Model with tailwheel landing gear and larger flaps for the European microlight category.
D19
Model with tricycle landing gear for the amateur-built category.
D195
Model with tricycle landing gear and larger flaps for the European microlight category.

Specifications (D185)

References

External links

1980s French ultralight aircraft
Homebuilt aircraft
Single-engined tractor aircraft
D018
Low-wing aircraft